Stephen Newbold (born 5 August 1994) is a Bahamian sprinter. He attended Florida State University.

Achievements

1Disqualified in the final

References

External links
 

1994 births
Living people
Bahamian male sprinters
Florida State Seminoles men's track and field athletes
Athletes (track and field) at the 2010 Summer Youth Olympics
Athletes (track and field) at the 2014 Commonwealth Games
Athletes (track and field) at the 2018 Commonwealth Games
Olympic bronze medalists for the Bahamas
Olympic bronze medalists in athletics (track and field)
Athletes (track and field) at the 2016 Summer Olympics
Olympic athletes of the Bahamas
Medalists at the 2016 Summer Olympics
Commonwealth Games medallists in athletics
Commonwealth Games silver medallists for the Bahamas
Competitors at the 2018 Central American and Caribbean Games
Medallists at the 2018 Commonwealth Games